Wolfgang Rademann (24 November 1934 – 31 January 2016) was a German television producer and journalist.

Life 
Rademann was born in Neuenhagen bei Berlin on 24 November 1934. He worked as a journalist and then as a television producer in Germany. He lived with German actress Ruth Maria Kubitschek in Berlin. He was a major influence on the entertainment program of Germany's public television station ZDF, where he was responsible for popular television series such as Das Traumschiff and The Black Forest Clinic.

Wolfgang Rademann lived in a detached house in Berlin-Nikolassee. He had been in a relationship with the actress Ruth Maria Kubitschek since 1976. He was also known for his "Berlin Schnauze". His grave is located in the Protestant churchyard of Berlin-Nikolassee. 

Rademann died on 31 January 2016 in Berlin at the age of 81.

Television productions 
 1964: Das Leben ist die größte Show (together with Henno Lohmeyer)
 Zwischenstation
 Gefragte Gäste
 Der Stargast
 Sing mit Horst (Horst Jankowski) 
 Peter-Alexander-Show (actor Peter Alexander)
 Anneliese Rothenberger gibt sich die Ehre (actress Anneliese Rothenberger)
 Anneliese Rothenberger stellt sich vor
 Lilli Palmer: Eine Frau bleibt eine Frau (actress Lilli Palmer)
 Die Wenche Myhre Show (actress Wenche Myhre)
 Ein verrücktes Paar (actor Harald Juhnke and actress Grit Boettcher)
 Künstlerstammtisch (tv-moderator Gustav Knuth) 
 Blauer Dunst 
 Treffpunkt Herz
 Insel der Träume, television series
 The Black Forest Clinic, television series (1985-1989)
 Das Traumschiff (since 1981)

Awards 
 Bambi Award (1982, 1985, 1990, 2015)
 1982 and 2000: Goldene Kamera
 1986: Order of Merit of the Federal Republic of Germany
 1990: Telestar
 2008: Goldener Gong
 2009: Krone der Volksmusik

References

External links 
 FAZ.net: Ein unerklärliches Phänomen

German television producers
German journalists
1934 births
2016 deaths
People from Märkisch-Oderland
Recipients of the Cross of the Order of Merit of the Federal Republic of Germany
ZDF people
Television people from Brandenburg